The 2013 Spanish Athletics Championships was the 93rd edition of the national championship in outdoor track and field for Spain. It was held on 27 and 28 July at the Polideportivo José Caballero in Alcobendas. It served as the selection meeting for Spain at the 2013 World Championships in Athletics.

The club championships in relays and combined track and field events were contested separately from the main competition.

Results

Men

Women

References

Results
XCIII Campeonato de España Absoluto . Royal Spanish Athletics Federation. Retrieved 2019-06-30.

External links 
 Official website of the Royal Spanish Athletics Federation 

2013
Spanish Athletics Championships
Spanish Championships
Athletics Championships
Sport in the Community of Madrid